Jamgön Ju Mipham Gyatso, or Mipham Jamyang Namgyal Gyamtso  (1846–1912) (also known as "Mipham the Great") was a very influential philosopher and polymath of the Nyingma school of Tibetan Buddhism. He wrote over 32 volumes on topics such as painting, poetics, sculpture, alchemy, medicine, logic, philosophy and tantra. Mipham's works are still central to the scholastic curriculum in Nyingma monasteries today. Mipham is also considered one of the leading figures in the Ri-me (non-sectarian) movement in Tibet.

Derivation of name
"Ju" ("holding") was Mipham's family name as his paternal clan is said to have originated as clear light deities who came to the human world holding a rope.
"Jamgön" (Skt. Mañjunātha) indicate that he was considered to be an emanation of the bodhisattva Mañjuśrī. His maternal uncle, Minister-Lama Drupchok Pema Tarjay,  named him Mipham Gyamtso ("Invincible Ocean" or "Unconquerable Ocean").
In Tibetan literature, the word "mi-pham" is the standard translation of the Sanskrit "ajita", meaning "unconquered", which is a common epithet of the celestial bodhisattva Maitreya.

Biography

Early life
Mipham the Great was born to an aristocratic family in 1846 in the Derge Principality of Kham or Eastern Tibet. He was recognized as an exceptional child from a young age, memorizing texts as early as age six. By the age of ten he had already composed many texts. At twelve, he entered the monastery as an ordinary monk of the Ogmin Urgyen Mindrolling lineage at a branch monastery of the great Nyingma seat Shechen.

When he was fifteen or sixteen, after studying the very difficult Mindrolling system of chanting for only a few days and praying to Manjushri, he is said to have completely mastered it. In an 18-month retreat he accomplished the form of Manjushri known as 'Lion of Philosophers' (Tibetan: smra ba'i seng ge), using a liturgy composed by the fifteenth Karmapa, Khakhyab Dorje. He made many medicinal pills blessed with Manjushri's mantra, and many miraculous signs were said to have been manifest. After this, it was said that he could accomplish any sutra or tantra without any effort, and no text was unknown to him. He went to many lamas to obtain the necessary lungs (oral transmissions), but he needed no study or teachings for any texts.

Teachers
Mipham was "a luminary of the nineteenth century Nyingma renaissance and Rime movement ecumenical movement, which started in the Kham region of eastern Tibet". As such he received teachings from masters of all lineages Nyingma and Sarma alike. His root gurus were Dza Patrul Rinpoche, from whom  he received instruction on Shantideva's Bodhicharyavatara and Dzogchen  and the renowned master Jamyang Khyentse Wangpo, from whom he received transmission of the orally transmitted or Kama and revealed or Terma lineages, and many other teachings. His other teachers included Jamgon Kongtrul Lodro Thaye; Dzogchen Khenpo Padma Vajra; Lab Kyabgon Wangchen Gyerab Dorje; Jubon Jigme Dorje; Bumsar Geshe Ngawang Jungne and Ngor Ponlop Jamyang Loter Wangpo.

Philosophy
A key theme in Mipham's philosophical work is the unity of seemingly disparate ideas such as duality and nonduality, conceptual and nonconceptual (nirvikalpa) wisdom, rational analysis and uncontrived meditation, presence and absence, immanence and transcendence, emptiness and Buddha nature. Mimicking the Sarma schools, Mipham attempted to reconcile the view of tantra, especially Dzogchen, with sutric Madhyamaka. This was in departure with the Nyingma school which generally positioned the view of tantra as superior to the view of Madhyamaka.

For Mipam, the unity of philosophical views is ultimately resolved in the principle of coalescence (Sanskrit: yuganaddha, Tib: zung 'jug), which is the nonduality of conventional and ultimate realities, of samsara and nirvana. Unlike Tsongkhapa who held that emptiness, as an absolute negation, was the definitive reality and view, Mipham sees coalescence of gnosis and emptiness, form and emptiness, etc. as "the ultimate hermeneutical cornerstone of his interpretations".

In his many texts Mipham explores the tension and dialectic that arises between philosophical reasoning of the ordinary mind (rnam shes) which is represented by the Madhyamaka philosophy and  luminous nonconceptual wisdom (ye shes), which is the focus of the teachings of Dzogchen. He attempts a synthesis of them to show that they are not incompatible perspectives and that the teachings of Dzogchen are in line with reason.

Two models of the two truths
Mipham developed a twofold model of the Buddhist two truths doctrine. The first model is the traditional Madhyamaka perspective which presents the two truths of emptiness and appearance, with emptiness representing the level of ultimate truth and appearance representing relative truth. In this model the two truths are really the same reality and are only conceptually distinct.

In his second model of the two truths, Mipham presents an authentic truth and an inauthentic truth. Authentic experience is any perception that is in accord with reality (gnas snang mthun) and perceptions which do not are said to be inauthentic. This differs from the first model because in the first model only emptiness is ultimate while in the second model the ultimate truth is the meditative experience of unitary wisdom. Instead of just being a negation, it includes the subjective content of the cognition of wisdom as well as the objective nature of reality. In this model the ultimate truth is also reality experienced nonconceptually, without duality and reification, which in Dzogchen is termed rigpa, while the relative truth is the conceptual mind (sems).

According to Mipham these two models do not conflict. They are merely different contextually; the first relates to the analysis of experience post meditatively and the second corresponds to the experience of unity in meditative equipose. This synthesis by Mipam is ultimately a bringing together of two different perspectives in Tibetan philosophy, rangtong and shentong, which Mipam associated with the teachings of the second turning (Prajnaparamita sutras) and third turning (Yogacara and Buddha nature sutras) respectively:

The emptiness taught in the middle wheel and the exalted body and wisdom taught in the last wheel should be integrated as a unity of emptiness and appearance. Without dividing or excluding the definitive meaning subject matters of the middle and last wheels, both should be held to be the definitive meaning in the way of just this assertion by the omniscient Longchen Rapjam. - Lion's Roar, exposition of Buddha nature.

For Mipham, both of these teachings are definitive and a middle way between both of them is the best way to avoid the extremes of nihilism and essentialism.

Fourfold valid cognition
Another original contribution of Mipham is his system of fourfold valid cognition (pramana) which has two conventional and two ultimate valid cognitions:

Conventional valid cognitions
Confined perception, ordinary valid experience
Pure vision free of distortion

Ultimate valid cognitions
Categorized Ultimate, emptiness as a negation known by mind
Uncategorized Ultimate, nonconceptual wisdom

Work and legacy
As scholar Robert Mayer remarks, Mipham "completely revolutionised rNying ma pa scholasticism in the late 19th century, raising its status after many centuries as a comparative intellectual backwater, to arguably the most dynamic and expansive of philosophical traditions in all of Tibetan Buddhism, with an influence and impact far beyond the rNying ma pa themselves."

Scope
In the Introduction to his critical study of the ontological debates between Mipham and his Gelugpa opponents (Mipham's Dialectics and the Debates on Emptiness) Lopon Karma Phuntsho defines Mipham as a polymath and gives this assessment of the scope of Mipham's work:

Mipham's works on both the exoteric or Sutrayana teachings and the esoteric or Vajrayāna teachings have become core texts within the Nyingma tradition. These works now hold a central position in the curriculum of all Nyingma monasteries and monastic colleges — occupying a place of esteem similar to the works of Sakya Pandita and Gorampa in the Sakya tradition; those of Tsongkhapa in the  Gelug tradition and of Kunkhyen Padma Karpo in the Drukpa Kagyu. Together with Rongzompa and Longchenpa, Mipham is considered to be one of the three "omniscient" writers of the Nyingma tradition.

Commentaries on Buddhist Śāstra
Although Mipham wrote on a wide range of subjects, Prof. David Germano identifies the most influential aspect of Mipham's career in that he "was the single most important author in the efflorescence of Nyingma exoteric literature in the nineteenth and twentieth centuries. Grounding himself theoretically in the writings of Longchenpa and other great Nyingma authors, Mipham produced brilliant exegetical commentaries on the great Indian philosophical systems and texts with a Nyingma orientation.".

E. Gene Smith also judged that Mipham's greatest contribution was "in his brilliant and strikingly original commentaries on the Indian treatises." Prior to Mipham, Nyingmapa scholars "had seldom written detailed pedagogical commentaries on the śāstras of exoteric Buddhism." Until his time the colleges or shedra associated with the great Nyingma monasteries of Kham, such as Dzogchen, Shechen, Kathog, Palyul and Tarthang lacked their own exegetical commentaries on these exoteric Mahayana śāstras, and students commonly studied Gelug commentaries on these fundamental texts. Grounding himself  in the writings of Śāntarakṣita, Rongzom Chokyi Zangpo, and Longchenpa, Mipham produced a whole array of brilliant exegetical commentaries on the great Indian philosophical systems and texts that clearly articulated a  Nyingma orientation or view.

The texts include his commentaries on the Mulamadhyamakakarika or Fundamental Stanzas on Wisdom by Nagarjuna; the Introduction to the Middle Way (Sanskrit: Madhyamakāvatāra) of Chandrakirti; the Quintessence of all Courses of Ultimate Wisdom (Jnanasarasamuccaya) of Aryadeva; commentaries on the major works of the Indian Buddhist logicians Dharmakirti and Dignaga; commentaries on the Five Treatises of Maitreya most notably, the Abhisamayalamkara; commentaries on several works of Vasubandhu including the Abhidharmakosha.  Mipham's commentary on the ninth chapter of Shantideva's Bodhicaryavatara,  the Shertik Norbu Ketaka,  "threw Tibetan scholarly circles into several decades of heated controversy," but "it was not the only tempest Mipham's new expositions raised." His commentary on the Madhyamakalamkara of Śāntarakṣita was also considered highly controversial.

Commentaries on Tantras
Mipham's commentary on the Guhyagarbha Tantra is entitled The Essence of Clear Light  or Nucleus of Inner Radiance— it is based on Longchenpa's commentary, Dispelling Darkness in the Ten Directions  which explains the Guhyagarbha from the Dzogchen point of view.

Mipham showed particular interest in the Kalachakra and the kingdom of Shambhala, and one of his last and most extensive of his esoteric works are his two volumes of commentary, initiation and sadhana related to the  Kalachakra Tantra, the esoteric teaching from Shambhala. Before he died in 1912, he said to his students that now he was going to Shambhala.

Mipham and Gesar
Throughout his life, Mipham showed a particular interest in the legend of the warrior king Gesar of Ling, a 12th-century figure whose epic is well-known and widely celebrated in eastern Tibet, and about whom Mipham wrote extensively.

The Gesar practice, known as "The Swift Accomplishment of Enlightened Activity Through Invocation and Offering" arose in the mind of Mipham as a gong-ter and was written down over the course of three years from the age of 31 to 34.  This practice invokes Gesar and his retinue and requests him to assist practitioners.

Medicine
Mipham's medical works continue to be highly regarded to this day.

Astrology and divination
Mipham also wrote extensively about astrology which was, in his words, a "delightful game" that he mastered in his teens but later applied to more serious topics such as medicine; these two topics, with various texts on more or less related topics of divination, occupy perhaps 2,000 pages of his writing. An entire volume of Mipham's is devoted to Ju-thig or divination using knots, a method that might be termed "Bon" in origin, for want of a more accurate term; this may have been the legacy of his family, who were doctors for several generations. Throughout his writings there are many resources for divination, in addition to astrology, including several rituals for looking in mirrors (pra-mo), one using dice (mo), pulling different-length 'arrows' (Wylie: da dar) out of a quiver and so on, compelling a non-human "bird" to whisper future news in one's ear, and so on. In one short text he prescribes various methods of divination (all drawn, Mipham emphasizes, from Tantric scriptures and commentaries) that make use of unusual sources of augury such as: the vicariously overheard chatter of women; sudden appearance of various animals, especially birds; weather phenomena; the shape, size and color of flames in the agnihotra or fire puja; the quality of burning butter lamps, especially the size of the flame, the amount and shape of smoke that arises; and the size and shape of the carbon deposit on the wick.

When some of his scholarly rivals thought it inappropriate for a monk to devote so much time to matters of future events, Mipham wrote a short essay explaining the purpose of divination, citing sources in the Sutras and Tantras where the utility and value of divination are explained.

Students
Mipham's most important students were Dodrub Rinpoche, Terton Sogyal, the Fifth Dzogchen Rinpoche, Gemang Kyab Gon, Khenpo Padmavajra, Katog Situ Rinpoche, Sechen Rabjam, Gyaltsab Tulku, Palyul Gyaltrul, Karma Yangtrul, Palpung Situ Rinpoche, Ling Jetrung, Adzom Drukpa (1842-1924), Togdan Shakya Shri, Ngor Ponlob, and others. The great tulkus of Sechen, Dzogchen, Katog, Palyul, Palpung, Dege Gonchen, Repkong and others of all lineages, Sakya, Gelug, Kagyu, and Nyingma, all became his disciples.

Emanations of Ju Mipham
According to one account shortly before he died, Mipham told his attendant:

This may be interpreted as a statement that his mindstream would have no further 'emanations' (Wylie: sprul pa (emanation body); sprul sku (tulku)). Conversely, according to another account in which he mentions the mindstream in passing and prophesies the shortly before his death to his student Khenpo Kunphel:

In the above account, shortly after the departure of Khenpo Kunphel he stated publicly, "Now, soon I shall depart. I shall not be reborn again in Tibet, therefore do not search for me. I have reason to go to Shambhala in the north."

Subsequently, a number of emanations have been recognized.

According to E. Gene Smith  "At least three rebirths were recognized in the decade following his death: 1) Zhe chen  Mi pham (a grandnephew of Mi pham rgya mtsho); 2) Tshe dbang bdud 'dul (1915/16-42) the last prince of Sde dge; 3. Khyung po Mi pham, an incarnation recognized by Rdzong gsar Mkhyen brtse  'Jam dbyangs chos kyi blo gros."

The next (third) Mipham in the line of the Dege Prince who died in 1942 was apparently born in Tibet in 1949 and recognised by Tengye Rinpoche of Lab i 1959  At that time he was enthroned and given responsibility for all monasteries previously held by the first and second incarnations. This third incarnation was also confirmed by Patrul Rinpoche who gave him relics of the previous incarnations and by Dilgo Khyentse Rinpoche, who he had recognized in a previous incarnation. This Mipham incarnate is the father of Thaye Dorje, one of two candidates to be recognized as the 17th Karmapa, and of 14th Sonam Tsemo Rinpoche, an important Gelug/Sakya tulku.
 
In 1995, Ösel Rangdröl Mukpo (b. 1962), the eldest son of renowned dharma master Chogyam Trungpa Rinpoche and Ani Könchok Palden, was recognized as a reincarnation of Mipham Rinpoche by HH Drubwang Padma Norbu Rinpoche, at the time the head of the Nyingma lineage. He is now known as Sakyong Mipham Rinpoche, and is the spiritual head of Shambhala International.

Alternate names
 Jamgon Ju Mipham  Gyatso (ʼJam-mgon ʼJu Mi-pham rgya-mtsho)
 Jamgön Mipham (ʼJam-mgon Mi-pham)
 Ju Mipham (ʼJu Mi-pham)
 Mipham  Gyatso (mi pham rgya mtsho)
 Ju Mipham Namgyal Gyatso (ʼju mi pham rnam rgyal rgya mtsho)
 Mipham Namgyal Gyatso (mi pham rnam rgyal rgya mtsho)
 Jamgon  Mipham  Gyatso (ʼjam mgon mi pham rgya mtsho)
 Mipham the Great (mi-pham chen-po)
 Lama Mipham (bla-ma mi-pham)
 Mipham Rinpoche (mi-pham rin-po-che)

In contemporary scholarship, the nomenclature "Mi-pam" and "Mipam" has become an accepted alternative.  Writers such as Hopkins and Duckworth have adopted this convention (see below).

English translations
For an excellent guide to his works in English, see the Great Masters Series article from Shambhala Publications 
 Buddhist Philosophy in Theory and Practice: Summary of the Philosophical Systems as Detailed in the Yid-bzhin-mdzod (excerpts).  Trans. Herbert V. Guenther.  Shambala Publications, Inc/Penguin, 1971/72 
 Calm and Clear by Lama Mipham.  Trans. Tarthang Tulku.  Dharma 1973
 Golden Zephyr: Instructions from a Spiritual Friend.  Nagarjuna and Lama Mipham.  Trans. Leslie Kawamura.  Dharma 1975
 Lama Mipham's commentary to Nagarjuna's Stanza's for a Novice Monk.  Trans. Glenn H. Mullin and Lopsang Rabgay.  LTWA 1978
 The Fish King's Power of Truth: A Jataka Tale Retold by Lama Mipham.  Arranged by Tarthang Tulku.  Dharma 1990
 Ways of Enlightenment: Buddhist Studies at Nyingma Institute, based on Mipham's mkhas 'jug.  Compiled and edited by Dharma Publishing staff.  Dharma 1993
 Gateway to Knowledge.  Trans. Erik Pema Kunsang. Rangjung Yeshe 1997-2012
 Vol 1 (1997) 
 Vol 2 (2002) 
 Vol 3 (2002) 
 Vol 4 (2012) 
 Mipham's Beacon of Certainty: Illuminating the View of Dzogchen, the Great Perfection.  Trans. John Whitney Petit.  Wisdom 1999
 Mo: The Tibetan Divination System.  Translated by Jay Goldberg.  Snow Lion 2000.
 Middle-way Meditation Instructions of Mipham Rinpoche.  Trans. Thrangu Rinpoche.  Namo Buddha 2001
 Introduction to the Middle Way: Chandrakirti's Madhyamakavatara with Commentary by Jamgön Mipham.  Trans. Padmakara Translation Group.  Shambhala 2002
 Speech of Delight: Mipham's Commentary of Shantarakshita's Ornament of the Middle Way.  Trans. Thomas H. Doctor.  Snow Lion 2004
 Maitreya's Distinguishing Phenomena and Pure Being with Commentary by Mipham. Trans. Jim Scott.  Snow Lion 2004
 The Adornment Of The Middle Way.  Trans. Padmakara Translation Group. Shantarakshita & Jamgon Mipham.  Shambhala 2005
 Gem that Clears the Waters: An Investigation of Treasure Revealers.  In "Tibetan Treasure Literature", trans. Andreas Doctor.  Snow Lion 2005.  pp. 56–71
 Fundamental Mind: The Nyingma View of the Great Completeness by Mi-pam-gya-tso, comm. by Khetsun Sangpo Rinbochay.  Trans. Jeffrey Hopkins.  Snow Lion 2006
 Middle Beyond Extremes: Maitreya's Madhyantavibhaga with Commentaries by Khenpo Shenga and Ju Mipham.  Trans. Dharmachakra Translation Committee.  Snow Lion 2007
 Mipam on Buddha-Nature: The Ground of the Nyingma Tradition.  Selected translations by Douglas S. Duckworth.  SUNY 2008
 White Lotus: An Explanation of the Seven-line Prayer to Guru Padmasambhava by Jamgön Mipham.  Trans. Padmakara Translation Group.  Shambhala 2008
 Garland of Jewels: The Eight Great Bodhisattvas.  Trans. Yeshe Gyamtso.  KTD Publications 2008
 The Way of the Realized Old Dogs, Advice that Points out the Essence of Mind, called "A Lamp that Dispels the Darkness".  Trans. Tony Duff.  PKTC 2009
 The Method of Preserving the Face of Rigpa, the Essence of Wisdom: An Aspect of Training in Thorough Cut.  Trans. Tony Duff.  PKTC 2009
 Luminous Essence: A Guide to the Guhyagarbha Tantra.  Trans. Dharmachakra Translation Committee.  Snow Lion 2009
 The Blessing Treasure: A Sadhana of the Buddha Shakyamuni by Mipham Rinpoche. A Commentary by Khenchen Palden Sherab Rinpoche & Khenpo Tsewang Dongyal Rinpoche.  Dharma Samudra 2009.
 The Wheel of Analytic Meditation. Trans. Adam Pearcey. In "The Collected Works of Dilgo Khyentse", Vol. 2. Shambhala 2010.
 Essence of Clear Light: An Overview of the Secret Commentary "Thorough Dispelling of Darkness throughout the Ten Directions".  Trans. Light of Berotsana.  Snow Lion 2010.  
 Unending Auspiciousness: The Sutra of the Recollection of the Noble Three Jewels, with Commentaries by Ju Mipham, Taranatha and the Author.  Trans. Tony Duff.  PKTC 2010.
 Jamgon Mipham: His Life and Teachings.  Selected translations by Douglas S. Duckworth.  Shambhala 2011
 The Verses of the Eight Noble Auspicious Ones.  CreateSpace 2013.
 Tengye Monlam, an Aspiration for the Spread of the Nyingma Teachings: The Oral Transmission that Gladdens the Dharma Kings in "Liberating Duality with Widsom Display: The Eight Emanations of Guru Padmasambhava".  Khenchen Palden Sherab Rinpoche and Khenpo Tsewang Dongyal Rinpoche.  Translated by Ann Helm.  Dharma Samudra 2013.
 Ornament of the Great Vehicle Sutras: Maitreya's Mahayanasutralamkara with Commentaries by Khenpo Shenga and Ju Mipham.  Trans. Dharmachakra Translation Committee.  Snow Lion 2014.
 Shower of Blessings. Yeshe Gyamtso. Ktd Publications 2015.
 The Wheel of Investigation and Meditation that Thoroughly Purifies Mental Activity and the Lamp That Dispels Darkness in "Pith Instructions: Selected Teachings and Poems".  Dilgo Khyentse. Shambhala 2015. (Only available as eBook).
 A Garland of Views: A Guide to View, Meditation, and Result in the Nine Vehicles. Padmakara Translation Group. Shambhala 2016.
 The Ketaka Jewel: A Commentary on the Prajna Chapter Making the Words and Meaning Easy to Understand .  Translated by Gawang Rinpoche and Gary Weiner.  CreateSpace 2016
 The Just King: The Tibetan Buddhist Classic on Leading an Ethical Life.  Translated by Jose Cabezon.  Shambhala 2017.
 Pointing to the Nature of Awareness (rtogs ldan rgan po rnams kyi lugs sems ngo mdzub tshugs kyi gdams pa mun sel sgron me), in "A Gathering of Brilliant Moons". Translated by Douglas Duckworth. Wisdom Publications, 2017. (Also translated in Duff 2009, above).
 The Wisdom Chapter: Jamgön Mipham's Commentary on the Ninth Chapter of the Way of the Bodhisattva.  Translated by The Padmakara Translation Group.  Shambhala, 2017.
 Mipham's Sword of Wisdom: The Nyingmapa Approach to Valid Cognition.  Khenchen Palden Sherab.  Wisdom Publications 2018.
 A Feast of the Nectar of the Supreme Vehicle: An Explanation of the Ornament of the Mahayana Sutras.  Padmakara Translation Group.  Shambhala 2018.
 Wondrous Talk Brought about by Conversing with a Friend; the Four Dharma Traditions of the Land of Tibet; Profound Instruction on the View of the Middle Way; the Essence of Mind; the Essence of Wisdom: How to Sustain the Face of Rigpa; the Nature of Mind; Lamp to Dispel Darkness; and Advice to the Dodrup Incarnation, Jigme Tenpe Nyima in "Beyond the Ordinary Mind: Dzogchen, Rimé, and the Path of Perfect Wisdom".  Translated by Adam Pearcey. Snow Lion, 2018.
 Uprooting Clinging: A Commentary on Mipham Rinpoche's Wheel of Analytic Meditation. Khenchen Palden Sherab and Khenpo Tsewang Dongyal Rinpoche.  Dharma Samudra, 2019.

Translations available online
Lotsawa House - Mipham Rinpoche Series  - Translations of several texts by Mipham Rinpoche.
The Sugatagarbha Translation Group - texts by Ju Mipham Rinpoché
Song of the Debate Between Wake and Dream A short teaching by Mipham Rinpoche.

See also
Mo (divination)

Notes

Sources

Primary sources
"Sherdrel Ketaka" The commentary of 9 Chapter of Bodhisattavacharya (shes rab le'u'i tshig don go sla bar rnam par bshad pa nor bu ke ta ka)  (accessed: Sunday November 8, 2009)
 Mipham's don rnam nges shes rab ral gri, The Sword of Prajna (DRG) & the translation of this text in English is also freely available from Lotsawa House
Root text of "Umajen" or "Madhyamakalamkara" by Shanta Rakshita. Commentary ("Jamyang Gyepai Zhalung") by Mipham Rinpoche.

Further reading
Studies of Mipham's thought
 Phuntsho, Karma. Mipham's Dialectics and Debates on Emptiness: To Be, Not to Be or Neither. (Routledge Critical Studies in Buddhism series).London: RoutledgeCurzon  (2005) .

 *
Mipham, J., Rinpoche, D. K. (2020). Lion of Speech: The Life of Mipham Rinpoche. Shambhala Publications. .

External links
'Jam-mgon 'Ju Mi-pham rgya-mtsho - Open Library
Mipham Rinpoche - Rigpa Wiki
Mipham Rinpoche Timeline
Mipham Rinpoche - Rangjung Yeshe Wiki
TBRC P252 mi pham rgya mtsho at TBRC
The Life and Works of Mipham Rinpoche - from Petit, John Whitney. Mipham's Beacon of Certainty: Illuminating the View of Dzochen, the Great Perfection. Boston: Wisdom Publications (1999).  p. 19-39
Lotsawa House  - Translations of several texts by Mipham Rinpoche
The Life of Mipham Jamyang Namgyal (1846–1912)
Table of Contents for the 27 volumes of the Collected Works of Mipham - in Tibetan
Ju Mohar Monastery - Mipham Rinpoche's monastery, where he accomplished Manjushri whilst on retreat
The Sugatagarbha Translation Group - texts by Ju Mipham Rinpoché

1912 deaths
1846 births
19th-century lamas
19th-century Tibetan people
20th-century Tibetan people
Scholars of Buddhism from Tibet
Lamas from Tibet
Nyingma lamas
Rinpoches
Shentong
Tibetan Buddhism writers
Tibetan philosophers
Qing dynasty Tibetan Buddhists
Tibetan Buddhist monks